is a former Japanese football player.

Club statistics

References

External links

1983 births
Living people
Chuo University alumni
Association football people from Tochigi Prefecture
Japanese footballers
J1 League players
J2 League players
Mito HollyHock players
FC Tokyo players
Association football defenders